Empress Wang Shen'ai (王神愛) (384 – September or October 412), formally Empress Anxi (安僖皇后, literally "the peaceful and careful empress") was an empress of Jin Dynasty (266–420).  Her husband was the developmentally disabled Emperor An.

Wang Shen'ai was the daughter of the official Wang Xianzhi, the son of the famed official and calligrapher Wang Xizhi.  Her mother Princess Xin'an was the daughter of Emperor Jianwen, making her and her husband cousins.  In 396, while he was still crown prince under his father Emperor Xiaowu, they married, and she became crown empress.  She was 12, and he was 14.  As he was described to be so developmentally disabled that he could not speak or dress himself, or express whether he was full or hungry, it was unlikely that their marriage was consummated; in any case, they had no children.  Later that year, after Emperor Xiaowu was killed by his concubine Honoured Lady Zhang after humiliating her, Emperor An became emperor. On 3 May 397, she was created empress.

Very little is known about Empress Wang's life as empress. In 403, after Emperor An's throne was usurped by the warlord Huan Xuan, she was effectively put under house arrest with her husband. In 404, after Liu Yu started a rebellion to reestablish Jin, Huan Xuan had her and her husband transported west with him after he resolved to flee west from the capital Jiankang, but on the way, Huan Xuan's brother-in-law Yin Zhongwen (殷仲文) rebelled against him and transported her and Emperor Mu's Empress He Fani back to Jiankang. Later that year, after Huan Xuan was killed and Emperor An was seized back from Huan Xuan's nephew Huan Zhen (桓振), he was reunited with her. She died in  September or October 412 and was buried with honors due an empress.

References 

|-

|-

|-

|-

|-

384 births
412 deaths
Jin dynasty (266–420) empresses
4th-century Chinese women
5th-century Chinese women
Huan Chu people
4th-century Chinese people
5th-century Chinese people